Icarus is the fourth album by American musical group Paul Winter Consort.  It was recorded in 1971 for the Epic Records label and released in 1972.  It was re-released by Epic in 1978 and by Living Music in 1984.  The album was produced by George Martin.

Critical reception 

Reviewing for Creem in 1973, Robert Christgau called Icarus a "kind of a classical/jazz mix but with none of the stiffness that suggests—inquisitive, contemplative, eclectic, peaceful. And eloquent, much more eloquent than my description, which does more for the music than the lyrics that obstruct a couple of cuts." Michael Tearson from Audio later said the music can be called "chamber jazz". In a retrospective review, AllMusic's William Ruhlmann gave Icarus three-and-a-half out of five stars and said "Winter's finest album marks a transitional point in his career from jazz to his own brand of contemporary instrumental. But one can simply revel in the lovely melodies, the contemplative sounds, and the tasteful production of George Martin, especially on the justly famous title track by Ralph Towner."

Track listing
 "Icarus" (Ralph Towner) - 3:02
 "Ode to a Fillmore Dressing Room" (David Darling) - 5:32
 "The Silence of a Candle" (Towner) - 3:22
 "Sunwheel" (Towner) - 4:52
 "Juniper Bear" (Collin Walcott) - 3:10
 "Whole Earth Chant" (Walcott, Paul Winter) - 7:42
 "All the Mornings Bring" (Paul McCandless) - 3:48
 "Chehalis and Other Voices" (Towner) - 5:26
 "Minuit" (J.S. Bach adaptation, Paul Winter) - 3:06

Personnel
 Paul Winter – soprano saxophone, vocals
 Paul McCandless – oboe, English horn, contrabass sarrusophone, vocals
 David Darling – cello, vocals
 Herb Bushler – bass guitar
 Ralph Towner – classical guitar, 12–string guitar, steel–string guitar, piano, bush organ, regal organ, vocals
 Collin Walcott – drums, kettledrums, congas, surdo, tabla, mridangam, bass marimba, sitar
 Billy Cobham – drums on "Sunwheel" and "Whole Earth Chant"
 Milt Holland – Ghanaian percussion on "Whole Earth Chant"
 Barry Altschul – random percussion
 Larry Atamanuik – drums on "Icarus"
 Andrew Tracey – dobro on "Minuit"
 Janet Johnson, Paul McCandless, Bob Milstein, Paul Stookey – chorus on "Minuit"

References

External links 
 

1972 albums
Paul Winter Consort albums
Albums produced by George Martin
Albums recorded at Electric Lady Studios
Epic Records